Lord Demon is a  fantasy novel by American writer Roger Zelazny, completed in 1999 by Jane Lindskold after his death.

It is a "scientific" fantasy built on favorite themes (the necessity of knowing oneself, taking risks, accepting the vulnerability that comes with feeling passionately etc.) of Roger Zelazny, drawing on East Asian, Irish, and hero's quest myths. It features his signature protagonist: a smart-mouthed cigarette-smoking erudite who can be poetic yet is detached, homicidal when angered but more often immersed in art, poetry, and the occasional creation of alternate realities. Also  kind to the weak and deeply romantic in his approach to women.

Reception
Charles de Lint praised Lord Demon, saying Lindskold had done "an exemplary job ... of capturing and retaining that wonderful gift Zelazny had of headlong invention, mythic characters made human, and deft, deliciously-convoluted plotting." He characterized the novel as "a worthy farewell to one of the best writers this field has produced."

References

1999 American novels
1999 fantasy novels
Novels by Roger Zelazny
American fantasy novels
Collaborative novels
Avon (publisher) books
Novels by Jane Lindskold